This is a list of the members of the 11th Riigikogu, following the 2007 election.

Election results

Lists

By party

Estonian Reform Party (31)

Estonian Centre Party (29)

Pro Patria and Res Publica Union (19)

Social Democratic Party (10)

Estonian Greens (6)

People's Union of Estonia (6)

By votes

References

11th